Marlene Kristina Burwick (born 23 June 1971) is a Swedish politician. From September 2018 to September 2022, she served as Member of the Riksdag representing the constituency of Uppsala County. She is a trained chemist by profession.

References 

Living people
1971 births
Place of birth missing (living people)
21st-century Swedish politicians
21st-century Swedish women politicians
Members of the Riksdag 2018–2022
Members of the Riksdag from the Social Democrats
Women members of the Riksdag

Swedish chemists